KTTR is a Top-40 formatted broadcast radio station licensed to Rolla, Missouri, serving Rolla and Phelps County, Missouri.  KTTR is owned and operated by Results Radio.

References

External links
 KTTR NewsRadio Online

 

TTR (AM)
Contemporary hit radio stations in the United States